The 1972 NAIA Soccer Championship was the 14th annual tournament held by the NAIA to determine the national champion of men's college soccer among its members in the United States.

Westmont defeated Davis & Elkins in the final, 2–1, to claim the Warriors' first NAIA national title. Davis & Elkins would later forfeit their second-place finish after it was determined they fielded an ineligible player.

For the third consecutive year, the final was  played in Dunn, North Carolina.

Qualification

For the fourth year, the tournament field remained fixed at eight teams. Unlike the previous three years, however, additional fifth- and seventh-place finals were not contested.

Bracket

 Davis & Elkins forfeited their second place finish due to an ineligible player.

See also  
 1972 NCAA University Division Soccer Tournament
 1972 NCAA College Division Soccer Tournament

References 

NAIA championships
NAIA
1972 in sports in North Carolina